Tomas Daumantas (born 30 August 1975) is a Lithuanian footballer currently playing for Patro Eisden Maasmechelen. He also has Belgian citizenship.

References 

 
 

Lithuanian footballers
Lithuania international footballers
FC Schalke 04 players
K.S.K. Beveren players
FK Austria Wien players
Club Brugge KV players
MVV Maastricht players
Sportfreunde Siegen players
Fortuna Sittard players
FC Vilnius players
Lithuanian expatriate footballers
Expatriate footballers in Germany
Lithuanian expatriate sportspeople in Germany
Expatriate footballers in Belgium
Lithuanian expatriate sportspeople in Belgium
Belgian people of Lithuanian descent
Expatriate footballers in Austria
Lithuanian expatriate sportspeople in Austria
Expatriate footballers in the Netherlands
Lithuanian expatriate sportspeople in the Netherlands
1975 births
Living people
Association football midfielders